The National Film Award for Best Non-Feature Film Narration / Voice Over is one of the National Film Awards given by Directorate of Film Festivals, India. It is instituted in 2003 and awarded at 51st National Film Awards.

Films made in any Indian language shot on 16 mm, 35 mm or in a wider gauge or digital format and released on either film format or video/digital but certified by the Central Board of Film Certification as a documentary/newsreel/fiction are eligible for non-feature film section.

Awards 

Following are the winners over the years:

References

External links 
 National Film Awards Archives
 Official Page for Directorate of Film Festivals, India

Narration Voice Over